The 2006–07 Serbian League East season was the fourth season of the league under its current title. It began in August 2006 and ended in June 2007.

League table

External links
 Football Association of Serbia
 Football Association of East Serbia

Serbian League East seasons
3
Serbia